UFC Fight Night: Chiesa vs. Lee (also known as UFC Fight Night 112) was a mixed martial arts event produced by the Ultimate Fighting Championship held on June 25, 2017, at Chesapeake Energy Arena in Oklahoma City, Oklahoma.

Background
The event was the second that the promotion has hosted in Oklahoma City, following UFC Fight Night: Diaz vs. Guillard in September 2009.

A lightweight bout between The Ultimate Fighter: Live lightweight winner Michael Chiesa and Kevin Lee served as the event headliner.

A featherweight bout between former UFC Lightweight and Welterweight Champion B.J. Penn and Dennis Siver took place at this event. The pairing was originally booked for UFC 199. However, the bout was cancelled due to Siver being injured.

Antônio Rogério Nogueira was expected to face Ilir Latifi at the event. However, on May 17, it was announced that Nogueira pulled out due to a neck injury. Subsequently, despite having six weeks to secure a replacement opponent, promotion officials elected to remove Latifi from the event entirely.

A featherweight bout between promotional newcomers, Jared Gordon and Michel Quiñones was expected to take place at UFC 211. However, Gordon pulled out of the fight on the day before the event due to stomach illness and as a result, Quiñones was removed from the card. The pairing was rescheduled for this event.

Promotional newcomer Azamat Murzakanov was expected to face Joachim Christensen at the event. However, Murzakanov was removed from the card on June 8 for undisclosed reasons and was replaced by fellow newcomer Dominick Reyes.

At the weigh-ins, former UFC Welterweight Champion Johny Hendricks and Jared Gordon missed the required weight for their respective fights, weighing in at 188 lb and 149 lb, respectively. They were both fined 20% of their purse which went to their respective opponents, Tim Boetsch and Michel Quiñones. The bouts proceeded at catchweight.

Results

Bonus awards 
The following fighters were awarded $50,000 bonuses:
Fight of the Night: None awarded
 Performance of the Night: Kevin Lee, Tim Boetsch, Dominick Reyes, and Jeremy Kimball

Reported payout
The following is the reported payout to the fighters as reported to the Oklahoma State Athletic Commission. It does not include sponsor money and also does not include the UFC's traditional "fight night" bonuses. The total disclosed payout for the event was $1,225,000. 
 Kevin Lee: $75,000 (includes $44,000 win bonus) def. Michael Chiesa: $36,000
 Tim Boetsch: $154,000 (includes $67,000 win bonus) def. Johny Hendricks: $80,000 ¹
 Felice Herrig: $50,000 (includes $25,000 win bonus) def. Justine Kish: $14,000
 Dominick Reyes: $24,000 (includes $12,000 win bonus) def. Joachim Christensen: $16,000
 Tim Means: $78,000 (includes $39,000 win bonus) def. Alex Garcia: $31,000
 Dennis Siver: $78,000 (includes $39,000 win bonus) def. B.J. Penn: $150,000
 Clay Guida: $110,000 (includes $55,000 win bonus) def. Erik Koch: $24,000
 Marvin Vettori: $24,000 (includes $12,000 win bonus) def. Vitor Miranda: $18,000
 Carla Esparza: $66,000 (includes $33,000 win bonus) def. Maryna Moroz: $23,000
 Darrell Horcher: $24,000 (includes $12,000 win bonus) def. Devin Powell: $10,000
 Jared Gordon: $18,000 (includes $10,000 win bonus) def. Michel Quiñones: $12,000 ²
 Tony Martin: $38,000 (includes $19,000 win bonus) def. Johnny Case: $23,000
 Jeremy Kimball: $24,000 (includes $12,000 win bonus) def. Josh Stansbury: $12,000

¹ Johny Hendricks was fined 20 percent of his purse ($20,000) for failing to make the required weight for his fight with Tim Boetsch. That money was issued to Boetsch, an OSAC official confirmed.
² Jared Gordon was fined 20 percent of his purse ($2000) for failing to make the required weight for his fight with Michel Quiñones. That money was issued to Quiñones, an OSAC official confirmed.

Aftermath
On June 29, it was announced that Chiesa filed a complaint against referee Mario Yamasaki and an appeal of the result, citing referee Yamasaki's "long history of failing to meet the standards officials are held to" in his request. He also mentioned illegal elbows delivered by Lee and Yamasaki's stoppage of the fight; Chiesa stated "I did not tap, I did not verbally submit, I was not knocked unconscious, and at no point did I go unconscious." Oklahoma State Athletic Commission (OSAC) administrator Joe Miller confirmed he has received the request and will review the bout before potentially presenting it to the commission. On July 20, the OSAC decided there "wasn’t enough evidence" to overturn Yamasaki's decision.

See also
List of UFC events
2017 in UFC

References

UFC Fight Night
Mixed martial arts in Oklahoma
Sports in Oklahoma City
2017 in mixed martial arts
2017 in sports in Oklahoma
June 2017 sports events in the United States